Ling Zhang (born in 1957) is a former senior audiologist and fiction writer in Toronto, Canada. She was born in Wenzhou, China and came to Canada in 1986 to pursue her MA in English at University of Calgary. She obtained her second MA degree in Communication disorders at the University of Cincinnati. She has published nine novels and several collections of novellas and short stories in Chinese. One of her novels,《金山》, has been translated into English, French, and German. She has won numerous important literary prizes in China.

In 2009, Zhang's novella, Aftershock (2010 film), a tale about the survival of the horrific 1976 Tangshan earthquake, was made into China's first IMAX movie, directed by Feng Xiaogang. This movie became the greatest box office success at the time and has grossed more than US$100 million at the Chinese box office. According to The Wall Street Journal, Aftershock opens the Imax market to Chinese films. The abc NEWS also mentions that Aftershock becomes the highest-grossing film in China.

In 2011, a lawsuit was launched against Zhang Ling for alleged copyright infringement from works by three Canadian writers. However, the case was closed with no judgment against either of the parties.

A Single Swallow, the English version of Zhang's novel《劳燕》, listed on 2017 Sina best ten books list/2017 新浪年度十大好书,  published by Amazon Crossing in October 2020, has immediately caught the media and readers' interest and was reviewed as “a literary work suffused with prodigious and descriptive exposition.” A Single Swallow became Amazon’s #1 Kindle bestseller in Chinese literature and WWII historical fiction. The novel also was the winner of AudioFile Earphones Award and was listed with The New York Times Globetrotting 2021.

Awards and honours

 Best novel in China (2017) - 张翎《劳燕》获2017《当代》长篇小说论坛年度最佳 ,
 Grand Prize, Overseas Chinese Literary Awards (2014) – 华侨华人文学奖评委会大奖
 Special Achievement Award for Overseas Chinese Writer, Chinese Association of Fiction (2010) – 中国小说学会海外作家特别奖
 "Lamb" (2003) and A Journey Home (2005) ranked among top ten by the Chinese Academy of Fiction Writing
 Winner of the Yuan Prize for Literature
 The People's Literature Award in China (2006)

Selected works

Novels

 A Single Swallow – 《劳燕》(2017), 人民文学出版社.  A Single Swallow (English) by Amazon Crossing 
 The Sands of Time  – 《流年物语》(2016), 十月文艺出版社
 Contractions  – 《阵痛》(2014)，作家出版社
 Tangshan Earthquake –《 唐山大地震》(2013)，花城出版社
 Sleep, Flo, Sleep –《睡吧，芙洛，睡吧》(2011)，十月文艺出版社
 Gold Mountain Blues  – 《金山》(2009)，十月文艺出版社. Gold Mountain Blues (English) by Penguin Canada, Le Rêve de la Montagne d'Or(French) by Renaud-Bray, and Der Traum vom Goldenen Berg (German) by Schöffling & Co.
 Mail-Order Bride  – 《邮购新娘》(2004)，作家出版社
 Beyond the Ocean – 《交错的彼岸》(2001) ，百花文艺出版社
 Sisters from Shanghai  –《 望月》(1998), 作家出版社

Collections of novellas and short stories

 The Way We Survive  endorsed by Mo Yan, Nobel Prize winner in literature 2012, – 《每个人站起来的方式，千姿百态》(2016), 长江文艺出版社
 A Summer's Tale  – 《一个夏天的故事》(2013)，花城出版社
 The Songs of Love  –《 恋曲三重奏》(2012)，江苏文艺出版社 
 The Darkest Night in Life  – 《生命中最黑暗的夜晚》(2012)，九州出版社
 A Woman at Forty  – 《女人四十》(2011)，中国工人出版社
 The Aftershock  – 《余震》(2010)，十月文艺出版社
 Yan's Journey Home  – 《雁过澡溪》(2006)，成都时代出版社
 Blind Date  – 《盲约》(2005)，花城出版社
 The World of Flesh – 《尘世》(2004)，广西人民出版社

References

External links
 Reading at York University
 Reading at the University of Toronto at Scarborough

1957 births
Living people
Audiologists
Canadian writers of Asian descent
Chinese women novelists
Writers from Toronto
21st-century Canadian women writers
University of Calgary alumni
University of Cincinnati alumni